Baron Yrjö Sakari Yrjö-Koskinen (birth name Georg Zakarias Forsman, author name Yrjö Koskinen; 10 December 1830 in Vaasa – 13 November 1903 in Helsinki) was a friherre, senator, professor, historian, politician and the chairman of the Finnish Party after Johan Vilhelm Snellman. He was a central figure in the fennoman movement. His original name was Georg Zakarias Forsman and his family from his father's side originated from Sweden. He later fennicized his name to Yrjö Sakari Yrjö-Koskinen. He was the husband of Finland's first female author, Theodolinda Hahnsson.

He is buried in the Hietaniemi Cemetery in Helsinki.

References

External links
 
 
 Yrjö Koskinen in 375 humanists 28.1.2015, Faculty of Arts, University of Helsinki

1830 births
1903 deaths
People from Vaasa
People from Vaasa Province (Grand Duchy of Finland)
Swedish-speaking Finns
Finnish people of Swedish descent
19th-century Finnish nobility
Finnish Party politicians
Finnish senators
Members of the Diet of Finland
19th-century Finnish historians
University of Helsinki alumni
19th-century Finnish politicians
Burials at Hietaniemi Cemetery
Barons of the Russian Empire